Antun Blažić (28 May 1916September 1943) was Croatian Jewish Partisan and People's Hero of Yugoslavia.

Blažić was born in Globočec Ludbreški on 28 May 1916. In 1941, Blažić become a member of the Communist Party of Yugoslavia. During World War II, he was actively involved in the organization of the Ludbreg region uprising. In the summer of 1941, as one of the first in his region, Blažić joined the Partisans. With Partisans he was a commissioner assistant to a detachment assigned to form the task force in the Ludbreg region. Since 1943, Blažić was member of the League of Communists of Croatia district committee for Varaždin. In Varaždin he also helped the Partisan groups organization. Blažić was member of ZAVNOH. In September 1943, while in village Maruševec, Blažić was attacked by Ustaše. As he was alone, he could not retreat and thus decided to kill himself so he would not be taken alive. On 5 May 1951, Blažić was declared People's Hero of Yugoslavia.

References

Bibliography

1916 births
1943 deaths
1943 suicides
People from Varaždin
Croatian Jews
Austro-Hungarian Jews
Jewish socialists
Jews in the Yugoslav Partisans
Croatian Austro-Hungarians
Yugoslav Partisans members
Croatian communists
Croatian people of World War II
Yugoslav military personnel killed in World War II
Croatian revolutionaries
Suicides in Croatia
Suicides in Yugoslavia
Croatian Jews who died in the Holocaust
Suicides by Jews during the Holocaust